Fritz Lee (born ) is a Samoan rugby union player. He currently plays for Clermont Auvergne in the Top 14. His regular playing position is eighthman. He previously played for the Chiefs in Super Rugby and Counties Manukau Steelers in the ITM Cup. He captained Counties Manukau in 2013 and led them to the playoffs; he also led them to their first ever Ranfurly Shield challenge win against Hawkes Bay in Napier.

Lee was born in Samoa, but left for New Zealand aged 15 to live with his uncle.

Lee signed a three-year contract with Clermont in 2013.

Biography 
He plays for the Counties Manukau provincial team and in the Super 14 with the Chiefs. He earned his first cap with the New Zealand Sevens in 2010. In September 2013, he joined the French league with ASM Clermont Auvergne as a medical joker for Elvis Vermeulen. In his first three games for ASM Clermont Auvergne in the Top 14, he literally impressed the observers with his quality of percussion, his play after contact, his vivacity (qualities that come mainly from rugby sevens) and his exemplary defensive involvement. The management immediately offered him a three-year contract, which he accepted.

References

External links 
 
 Chiefs profile
 Yahoo NZ profile
 

Living people
1988 births
Samoan rugby union players
Chiefs (rugby union) players
Counties Manukau rugby union players
ASM Clermont Auvergne players
Rugby union number eights
Samoan expatriate rugby union players
Expatriate rugby union players in New Zealand
Samoan expatriate sportspeople in New Zealand
Expatriate rugby union players in France
Samoan expatriate sportspeople in France
New Zealand international rugby sevens players